Anong Beam is an Ojibwe artist and curator from M'Chigeeng First Nation, Ontario.

Early life and education 
Born Anong Migwans Beam, Beam is the daughter of award winning Indigenous artist Carl Beam and feminist artist Ann Elena Weatherby.

In 1998 Beam attended the visual arts program School of the Museum of Fine Arts, Boston. This was followed by Beam attending the Ontario College of Art and Design from 1999-2000 and the Institute of American Indian Arts in 2001.  Beam is currently a Masters student at York University.

Career 
Beam's artistic work is influenced by her sense of place and many of her paintings are connected to her home on Manitoulin Island.

In addition to her artistic work Beam has been actively involved in her local community and is well known for her curatorial work.  In 2007 Beam was one of the founders of Gimaa Radio Communications, an English and Ojibwe language radio station in M'Chigeeng First Nation.  The station is focused on Ojibwe language preservation and local Indigenous musical performances. From 2016-2017 Beam served as the Art Director of the Ojibwe Cultural Foundation.  In 2017 she transitioned to become the Executive Director of the Ojibwe Cultural Foundation.

In 2017, Beam also launched her own line of watercolour and oil paints known as "BEAM Paints". The minerals and pigments for the paints are all locally sourced by Beam.

Beam has also been an outspoken advocate for the preservation of Indigenous archaeology and Indigenous ceramics within local communities.

Work

Solo exhibitions 

 "New Works on Canvas" the Spoke Club, Toronto, ON (2018)
 "63 Views of Dreamers Rock", Beaverbrook Art Gallery,, Fredericton, NB (2016)
 "Submerged Landscapes", Station Gallery, Whitby, ON. (2016)
 "Reservoir" Latcham Gallery, Stouffvile, ON (2014)
 "Watershed", Art Gallery of Sudbury, Sudbury, ON (2012)
 "The Return Home", Gary Farmer Gallery of Contemporary Art, Santa Fe, NM (2007)
 "New Works", Ojibwe Cultural Foundation, M'Chigeeng, ON (2003)
 "Evolver", Gallery On Herald, Victoria, BC (2002)

Public collections 
Beam's work is part of the following permanent collections:

Archives of Ontario Queens Park Legislature
Art Gallery of Peterborough
 Beaverbrook Art Gallery, New Brunswick
 Ford Foundation, New York, NY
 Art Gallery of Sudbury
 Art Gallery of Nova Scotia, Halifax, NS
 Museum of Contemporary Native Arts, Santa Fe, NM
 Ojibwe Cultural Foundation, M'Chigeeng, ON
 Canadian Clay and Glass Gallery, Waterloo, ON
 Royal Ontario Museum, Toronto, ON

References

External links 

 Annong Migwans Beam's Website

Year of birth missing (living people)
Living people
Created via preloaddraft
Ojibwe people
First Nations painters
Canadian ceramists
Canadian women painters
First Nations women
21st-century Canadian women artists
21st-century ceramists
Canadian women ceramists
Canadian art curators